This is a complete list of all Mush Records so far.

Releases

References

Discographies of American record labels